The Famous Grouse is a brand of blended Scotch whisky produced by The Edrington Group in Scotland. It was first produced by Matthew Gloag & Son in 1896. The single malt whiskies used in The Famous Grouse blend include the Edrington-owned Highland Park and The Macallan. Its emblem is the red grouse, Scotland's national game bird.

It has been the highest-selling whisky brand in Scotland since 1980. As a standard price blended Scotch whisky, its main competitors in its home market are Grant's, Bell's and Teacher's. The majority of its sales in the United Kingdom are during the Christmas period.

History 

Matthew Gloag was a grocer and wine merchant at 22 Atholl Street, Perth, Scotland. Gloag originally specialised on imported wines and ports from France, Spain and Portugal. When Queen Victoria visited Perth in 1842, he was invited to supply the wines for the royal banquet.

In 1860, his son, William Gloag, took over the company. Following the Great French Wine Blight the company began to look at creating its own blended whiskies around 1875.  In 1896, William's nephew, Matthew Gloag (1850-1912), took over the family business. He created a new blended brand called The Grouse in 1896. at this time the company was still operating from the grandfather's premises but had expanded to occupy adjacent shops, jointly covering 20 to 26 Atholl Street. In 1905 the limited company of Matthew Gloag & son was formed and the Grouse was renamed The Famous Grouse in the same year. Matthew Gloag's daughter Phillippa first designed the label's grouse icon. Only at this point did the company move to new purpose-built premises on Kinnoull Street.

In 1970, Matthew Gloag & Son, owned by the Gloag family, was sold to Highland Distillers, after the death of the chairman, Matthew Frederick Gloag. The marketing and distributive power of the company saw Famous Grouse become the highest selling Scotch in Scotland by 1980 and the second highest selling in the United Kingdom. From the 1980s the brand began to be exported overseas, where it now sells over 2 million cases annually. In 1984 The Famous Grouse was awarded the Royal Warrant.

Characteristics 

The standard blend is 40% ABV.

The blend goes through a marrying process for up to six months at 46% ABV. It is mandated by The Scotch Whisky Association (SWA) that, in order to call a whisky "Blended Scotch", the youngest alcoholic component in the drink needs to be matured for at least three years. This implies that all single malt and single grain whiskies used to create that "Blended Scotch" must have been matured as prescribed for at least three years.
The manufacturers, however, do not state how old the youngest malt in their blend is. Rather, they optimize the standard taste by blending casks of varying ages among batches. The ageing is done in oak casks.

Variants 

In 2007 a peated special version of The Famous Grouse called The Black Grouse developed for the Swedish market was released. The packaging displays a black grouse in place of the usual red grouse. The following year a special version, meant for chilling, was released called The Snow Grouse.  The packaging features a ptarmigan.

In 2011, The Naked Grouse was launched as its premium product. Initially as a high-end blended whisky, in 2017 it was turned into blended malt whisky.

United States distribution 
Beam Suntory distribute The Famous Grouse and other Edrington brands in the U.S. market.

Promotions and sponsorships 

The Famous Grouse has focussed its television advertising around the Christmas period since 1996.

The Famous Grouse was the primary sponsor of the Perth-based football team St Johnstone between 1986 and 1989 and again between 1991 and 1998. It also sponsored the Scotland national rugby union team from 1990 until 2007, and was 'The Official Spirit of Scottish Rugby' from 2013 for three years.

In May 2014, The Famous Grouse was named the official whisky of the 2014 Commonwealth Games in Glasgow.

References

Bibliography 

 

Scottish brands
Blended Scotch whisky
1896 establishments in Scotland
Products introduced in 1896